Niclas Kroon (born 5 February 1966) is a former tennis player from Sweden.  The right-hander turned pro in 1986 and reached his career-high singles ranking on the ATP Tour of World No. 46 in December 1989.  His best performance at a Grand Slam came at the 1990 French Open, where he reached the fourth round.

During his career, Kroon was known for the 'Vicht' salute as a form of celebration. This was later adopted by Lleyton Hewitt, who bought the rights to the trademark after Kroon had mistakenly let it lapse.

Career finals

Singles: 1 (1 title)

Doubles: 1 (1 runner-up)

References

External links
 
 

1966 births
Living people
Sportspeople from Karlstad
People from Monte Carlo
Swedish male tennis players
Swedish expatriates in Monaco